Sam Lawrence (born January 29th, 1970) is an American software entrepreneur. He is founding CMO of business communications company Jive Software as well as the CEO and co-founder of the customer-acquistion service Crushpath.

Early life and education 
Lawrence grew up in Syracuse, New York in a Jewish family. He moved to Austin, Texas, at age 10 and attended Johnston High School. He later attended Texas State University. Lawrence entered a graduate program at the University of Arizona. After his interest was captured by the early success of other computer applications such as Kermit and Telnet, Lawrence dropped out of the program to pursue his own Internet-based company.

Career 
After leaving graduate school, Lawrence worked at various start-ups and tech companies in Austin, Texas, and San Francisco including SicolaMartin, Dell, CNET, 3Com, Euro RSCG, and McCann Erickson.

In 2005, Lawrence joined Jive Software. Working in the position of CMO, he led the product strategy direction for an Enterprise-class Enterprise 2.0 suite. Lawrence later led what became known as the Social Business Software category. Jive Software was named a leader in three Gartner Magic Quadrants and had its IPO in December, 2011 (NASDAQ: JIVE).

Following his time at Jive, Lawrence co-founded San Francisco based Crushpath in April 2011. 

Lawrence runs the blog Go Big Always and has been a speaker at Web 2.0, Enterprise 2.0, LeWeb, MobileBeat, CES, and DEMO.

Lawrence was named an Invesp Top 100 Influential Marketer in 2008 and 2009.

Personal life 
Lawrence has three sons, and lives in the San Francisco Bay Area with his wife, April Lawrence.

References 

21st-century American businesspeople
Living people
1970 births